Hendrik Hubert Frehen (born 24 Jan 1917 in Landgraaf; died 1986) was a Dutch clergyman and bishop for the Roman Catholic Diocese of Reykjavik. He was ordained in 1943, and appointed bishop in 1968.

References

20th-century Dutch Roman Catholic priests
1917 births
1986 deaths
People from Landgraaf
20th-century Roman Catholic bishops in Iceland